These hits topped the Belgian Ultratop 50 in 2011.

See also
2011 in music

References

Ultratop 50
Belgium
2011